Warm Lake is a  lake in Idaho, United States. It is the largest natural lake in Boise National Forest.

The lake's abundance of wildlife makes it very popular for camping, fishing, and hunting. Large mammals present in the area include moose, mule deer, black bear, and elk. Large birds present in the area include bald eagles and osprey. The lake contains rainbow, brook, lake, and bull trout as well as mountain whitefish and Kokanee salmon.

There are two lodges at the lake, North Shore Lodge, which was established in 1936, and Warm Lake Lodge, which was established in 1911. The Forest Service operates three campgrounds around the lake.

References

Lakes of Idaho
Lakes of Valley County, Idaho
Tourist attractions in Valley County, Idaho
Boise National Forest